Ramesvara dasa (born Robert Grant) was one of the leading disciples of A. C. Bhaktivedanta Swami Prabhupada (Srila Prabhupada) and formerly a guru within the International Society of Krishna Consciousness (ISKCON - The Hare Krishna Movement).

Ramesvara became an initiated disciple of Srila Prabhupada on April 28, 1971, receiving his initiation by mail. From 1976-1986 Ramesvara was a member of ISKCON's Governing Body Commission (GBC) and became a BBT Trustee for the Bhaktivedanta Book Trust (BBT) in February 1975, working from their headquarters in Los Angeles. He later become head of the North American BBT. In 1987, the GBC accepted his resignation from all GBC management responsibilities within ISKCON. He never resigned from the BBT, as it was a lifetime appointment by the BBT founder, AC Bhaktivedanta Swami.

Notes

References
 

Former International Society for Krishna Consciousness religious figures
Converts to Hinduism
American Hare Krishnas
Year of birth missing (living people)
Living people